Bill Gaskins (born May 25, 1953) is an American photographer and academic. His work explores the intersection of black hair and critical analysis of the portraiture in the 21st century. In his book Good And Bad Hair: Photographs, Gaskins tackles the role of hairstyling and the representation in African American culture and he also examines the transcultural role of hair, adornment of ornaments and personal identity with the body.

Life and education
Gaskins received his Bachelor of Fine Arts degree from the Tyler School of Art, a Master of Arts Degree from The Ohio State University, and a Master of Fine Arts Degree from the Maryland Institute College of Art. He was a 2008 Artist-in-Residence at the McColl Center for Art + Innovation.

Academic work
Bill Gaskins has previously taught in the American Studies Program and the Department of Art at Cornell University. He also taught at Parsons the New School, and the graduate program in Media Studies in The New School for Public Engagement. His lectures focus on an examination of race and visual representation of the black portraiture and black women. He also has conducted workshops on the history of photography.

Photography
Gaskins has exhibited his photography including a group exhibition at the Jersey City Museum that also included work by Renée Green, Chitra Ganesh, Simone Leigh and Sharon Louden, and a screening of his short film, The Meaning of Hope at Detroit Institute of Arts.

His series of photographs The Cadillac Chronicles depicts black men with their Cadillacs. It was inspired by a Baltimore tradition, the Cadillac Parade, and explores the symbolism of the Cadillac as an emblem of male power and middle-class status.

His book Good and Bad Hair (1997) depicts African American hairstyles, and was based on a 1996 exhibition at Robert B. Menschel Photography Gallery.

His work was also shown in the 2003 group show HairStories at Scottsdale Museum of Contemporary Art: the Phoenix New Times called his "Tireka and Tamana, Easter Sunday, Baltimore, Maryland", a photograph of two women against the landscape of industrial Baltimore, and his photographs of African-American hair shows "the most fascinating photos of all" in the exhibition.

"Tamara and Tireka" also featured in a Smithsonian Institution exhibition Reflections in Black: A History of Black Photographers 1840 to the Present in Los Angeles.

In 2017, Gaskins spent time researching "The Black Photographers Annual," a four volume anthology published between 1973 and 1980.

Books

Selected essays 
 “Anthony Barboza in Conversation with Bill Gaskins.” Nka: Journal of Contemporary African Art, vol. 2015, no. 37, Nov. 2015, pp. 16–27. EBSCOhost, https://doi.org/10.1215/10757163-3339827.
 Gaskins, Bill. “Sonya Clark.” New Art Examiner 24 (March 1997): 46.
 Gaskins, Bill. “Richard Hunt.” New Art Examiner, vol. 24, May 1997, pp. 50–51.

Exhibitions 
Gaskins photography has been included in several exhibitions.

Collections
 Sprint Corporation Art Collection. Acquired Exercising Benefits (2002), three triptychs surrounded by photographs of Sprint employees using the company's fitness center.

Footnotes

External links
 
Bill Gaskins on the African American Visual Artists Database.

American photographers
African-American photographers
20th-century American photographers
21st-century American photographers
Living people
1953 births
20th-century African-American artists
21st-century African-American artists